This list is of the Cultural Properties of Japan designated in the category of  for the Prefecture of Nagano.

National Cultural Properties
As of 1 December 2014, two Important Cultural Properties have been designated, being of national significance.

Prefectural Cultural Properties
As of 1 December 2014, seven properties have been designated at a prefectural level.

See also
 Cultural Properties of Japan
 List of National Treasures of Japan (historical materials)
 List of Historic Sites of Japan (Nagano)
 Shinano Province
 List of Cultural Properties of Japan - paintings (Nagano)

References

External links
  Cultural Properties in Nagano Prefecture
  Cultural Properties in Nagano Prefecture

Cultural Properties,historical materials
Historical materials,Nagano